Psammophylax is a genus of snakes of the family Psammophiidae.

Species
 Psammophylax kellyi Keates, Conradie, Greenbaum, & Edwards, 2019 - Tanzanian grass snake, Tanzanian skaapsteker 
 Psammophylax multisquamis (Loveridge, 1932) - Kenyan striped skaapsteker 
 Psammophylax ocellatus (Bocage, 1873) - Angolan skaapsteker
 Psammophylax rhombeatus (Linnaeus, 1758) - spotted grass snake, spotted skaapsteker, rhombic skaapsteker
 Psammophylax tritaeniatus (Günther, 1868) - three-lined grass snake, striped skaapsteker
 Psammophylax variabilis Günther, 1893 - grey-bellied grass snake, grey-bellied skaapstekker

References 

Psammophylax
Snake genera
Taxa named by Leopold Fitzinger